Almighty Fire is the twenty-fourth studio album by American singer Aretha Franklin, released on April 13, 1978, by Atlantic Records. By the time of the album's release, Franklin was going through a commercial slump, due in part to the widespread popularity of disco.

Franklin was reunited with Curtis Mayfield after their earlier success together with the Sparkle soundtrack.

The title single reached at #12 on the Billboard R&B Singles Chart and the follow-up single, "More Than Just a Joy", peaked at #51.
The album earned a Grammy nomination for Best R&B Vocal Performance, Female at the 1979 Grammy Awards.

Track listing
All tracks composed by Curtis Mayfield, except where noted.

Side one
"Almighty Fire (Woman of the Future)" – 4:36
"Lady, Lady" – 2:45
"More Than Just a Joy" – 3:03
"Keep On Loving You" – 3:12
"I Needed You Baby" – 4:38

Side two
"Close to You" – 4:22
"No Matter Who You Love" – 4:01
"This You Can Believe" – 4:46
"I'm Your Speed" (Aretha Franklin, Glynn Turman) – 3:40

Personnel 
 Aretha Franklin – vocals
 Curtis Mayfield – guitar
 Gary Thompson – guitar
 Joseph "Lucky" Scott – bass guitar
 Donnell Hagan – drums
 Henry Gibson – congas
 Rich Tufo – keyboards, arrangements
 Lenard Druss – horns contractor
 Sol Bobrov – strings contractor
 Alfonzo Surrett – background vocals
 Mattie Butler – background vocals
 Ricki Linton – background vocals
 Denese Heard and the Jones Girls – background vocals

Production
 Producer – Curtis Mayfield
 Engineers – Roger Anfinsen and Fred Breitberg
 Remix – Roger Anfinsen 
 Mastered by Dennis King at Atlantic Studios (New York City).
 Album cover concept – Aretha Franklin

References

External links
Almighty Fire (Woman of the Future)

1978 albums
Aretha Franklin albums
Albums produced by Curtis Mayfield
Atlantic Records albums